David Willsie (born March 28, 1968) is a Canadian coach and former Wheelchair rugby player.

Early life
Willsie was born on March 28, 1968, in Dorchester, Ontario, Canada to parents John and Jean. His 
father was an international ice hockey referee and his cousin Brian Willsie played in the National Hockey League. Willsie was born and raised in London, Ontario and earned a marketing diploma from Fanshawe College.

Willsie was a semi-pro baseball player and a cross-country runner before being left quadriplegic following a recreational hockey game in 1995. While recovering in the hospital, Willsie was recruited by a local coach from Strathroy to play para-rugby. At the time, he was not interested in wheelchair sports because he felt that they were more of a "consolation" sport. However, after visiting a local wheelchair rugby group and seeing their intensity, he chose to pursue the sport. Following this, he started playing wheelchair rugby with the London Annihilators in 1997 and made the Ontario team in 1998. He officially joined the Canadian National Wheelchair Rugby team in 1999.

Career
Upon qualifying for the Canadian National Wheelchair Rugby team, Willsie made his Paralympic Games debut in 2000. The team came in fourth and it was the first international showing where the team did not medal. During the competition, he served as co-captain. He remained as captain for the 2004 Summer Paralympics, where he won a silver medal. The teams' experience during the Games were captured in the documentary Murderball which was nominated for the Academy Award for Best Documentary Feature. Willsie returned to Team Canada for the 2008 Summer Paralympics where he helped them win a bronze medal.
 
As a result of his athletic achievements, Willsie's hometown recreation centre included a purpose-built training facility for use by Willsie and his team. After winning another silver medal at the 2012 Summer Paralympics, Willsie was the recipient of the Queen Elizabeth II Diamond Jubilee Medal. After Canada failed to medal in the 2016 Summer Paralympics, Willsie retired from competing but accepted an assistant coaching position with the national team. In 2017, Willsie and Garett Hickling became the first ever rugby players to have their jerseys retired by the Canadian Wheelchair Sports Association.

References

External links
 
 

1968 births
Living people
Fanshawe College alumni
Canadian wheelchair rugby players
Paralympic bronze medalists for Canada
Paralympic silver medalists for Canada
Medalists at the 2004 Summer Paralympics
Medalists at the 2008 Summer Paralympics
Medalists at the 2012 Summer Paralympics
Paralympic medalists in wheelchair rugby
Wheelchair rugby players at the 2016 Summer Paralympics
Wheelchair rugby players at the 2004 Summer Paralympics
Wheelchair rugby players at the 2008 Summer Paralympics
Wheelchair rugby players at the 2012 Summer Paralympics
Wheelchair rugby players at the 2000 Summer Paralympics
Paralympic wheelchair rugby players of Canada